Johnny Jung ( born June 19, 1987), better known by his stage name Johnnyphlo, is a Korean-American rapper, songwriter and producer. Best known for his collaborative work with various artists such as Ailee, Jay Park, Decipher, Dumbfoundead and more. Currently, he is pursuing his career in the Korean K-pop industry.

Biography
 
"Everyone may have a dream but not everyone chooses to pursue it. But some, like JohnnyPhlo, never really had a choice.

Initial inspiration struck him at the age of 13 in the form of a Hip-Hop mix CD and it was love at first listen. Shortly thereafter, JohnnyPhlo started crafting his own material. Short battle rhymes and cipher lines progressed into hooks and verses. Written lyrics eventually became songs. He found his passion and there was no denying it. Never could he have known a little plastic disc would start the convergence of dream and reality.

Since that day, it has always been about the love of the art, first and foremost. In 2004, a new opportunity birthed itself in the form of Treble & Bassment Records, a label started in partnership with producer James "J-Star" Kim. They worked ceaselessly to develop, record, and promote a full roster of artists including the talented R&B songstress and now a K-Pop a superstar, Ailee and Hip-Hop's leader of the new school, Decipher. Quickly recognizing the gifts and potential of his signees JohnnyPhlo pushed his own artistic aspirations aside and dedicated himself to managing, engineering and executive producing for his artists. He understood that if they didn't have a platform to share their voices it was not they who were missing out; rather it was everyone else that never got to hear them. T&B Records quickly gained recognition in the independent Asian-American music community and although JohnnyPhlo never found himself in the spotlight during this time he was still living his dream.

However life wasn't without its fair share of struggles. In September 2006 JohnnyPhlo found himself at a crossroads amidst mounting personal complications and tension. Recognizing the need for focus and a new personal outlook, he decidedly stepped away from T&B and music as a whole. Fortunately his hiatus proved to be short-lived as he couldn't ignore his heart. In 2008, two years after he left the scene, JohnnyPhlo returned to much fanfare with his own song entitled "Eraser" and hasn't looked back since.

Finally with the opportunity to answer his own calling, JohnnyPhlo has steadily moved forward with his vision. In 2009, he co-found Muzo Entertainment, an independent talent management, with his close colleagues, re-grouping the original roster of artists and longtime friends, Ailee and Decipher. Since then Muzo Entertainment and its artists played prominent role in the Asian American music community.

In 2011, with years of successful career in the Asian American underground scene behind him, Johnnyphlo signed a record deal and decided to further pursue his career in the Korean mainstream market. His future remains uncertain and it may not end up flashy and bright, but it will be beautiful. Because it is not now, nor has it ever been about himself. It's for the love of the art.

This is more than just "real talk". It's real music."

Discography

Singles

Album

References

1987 births
Living people
South Korean emigrants to the United States
South Korean male rappers
South Korean pop singers